Raymond Harry Meiklejohn (born November 7, 1935) is a Canadian retired politician and educator.

Early life 
Meiklejohn was born on November 7, 1935 in Quill Lake, Saskatchewan to Robert James Meiklejohn and Ada Maria Woodbury.

He received his primary and secondary education in Quill Lake. After graduating, Meiklejohn attended Saskatoon Teacher's College and the University of Saskatchewan, where he earned a Bachelor of Education degree in 1965 and a postgraduate diploma in 1975.

Prior to his entry into politics, Meiklejohn worked as a teacher and special education administrator in Saskatoon.

Political career 
Meiklejohn ran unsuccessfully in the Kelvington-Wadena district in the 1978 provincial general election. He was first elected to the Saskatchewan Legislature in 1986 and served as the Progressive Conservative member for the Saskatoon Mayfair constituency until 1991. Meiklejohn ran unsuccessfully in the 1984 federal election as a Progressive Conservative in the Humboldt—Lake Centre riding.

Meiklejohn served in the Grant Devine government as Minister of Science and Technology (1986–1990); Minister of Consumer and Commercial Affairs (1988–1989); and Minister of Education (1989–1991). Meiklejohn was Minister Responsible for Saskatchewan Research Council (1986–1989); Meewasin Valley Authority (1986–1991); Agricultural Implements Board (1988–1989); Future Corporation (1989); Saskatchewan Gaming Commission (1989); Teachers' Superannuation Commission (1989–1991); Saskatchewan Communications Advanced Network (1989–1990); Status of Women (1990–1991).

After losing his seat in the 1991 provincial general election to Carol Teichrob (NDP), Meiklejohn worked as a scholarship trust fund representative and pager salesman for Rogers Cantel in Saskatoon.

Meiklejohn is currently (2006) semi-retired and resides in Platteville, Wisconsin, where his wife, Carol Sue Butts, was Provost and Vice-Chancellor of the University of Wisconsin–Platteville.

Family 
Meiklejohn has three children with his first wife, Maidra Creswell: Laurel Rae, Elliott Craig and Catherine Elizabeth. He married Dr. Carol Sue Butts on October 6, 1990.

References
Saskatchewan Members of the Legislature
Ray Meiklejohn bio at the Saskatchewan Archives

Progressive Conservative Party of Saskatchewan MLAs
University of Saskatchewan alumni
People from Platteville, Wisconsin
1935 births
Living people
Members of the Executive Council of Saskatchewan